Colin Peter Groves (24 June 1942 – 30 November 2017) was a British-Australian biologist and anthropologist. Groves was Professor of Biological Anthropology at the Australian National University in Canberra, Australia.

Education
Born in England, Groves completed a Bachelor of Science at University College London in 1963, and a Doctor of Philosophy at the Royal Free Hospital School of Medicine in 1966. From 1966 to 1973, he was a Postdoctoral Researcher and Teaching Fellow at the University of California, Berkeley, Queen Elizabeth College and the University of Cambridge.

Career
Groves emigrated to Australia in 1973 and joined the Australian National University, where he was promoted to full Professor in 2000 and remained Emeritus Professor until his death.

Along with the Czech biologist Professor Vratislav Mazák, Groves was the describer of Homo ergaster. Groves also wrote Primate Taxonomy published by the Smithsonian Institution Press in 2001, and Ungulate Taxonomy, co-authored by Peter Grubb (2011, Johns Hopkins Press).

He was an active member of the Australian Skeptics and had many published skeptical papers, as well as research papers covering his other research interests. He also conducted regular debates with creationists and anti-evolutionists. Groves opposed the arguments of creationism, stating "It is a great mistake to ignore the threat: it will not just go away, it must be countered. ... Scientists, but most especially archaeologists, are in the front line; we, not the artists or the politicians, are the ones with ammunition to stem the tide of creationist rubbish, and relegate it to Monty Python's Flying Circus where it belongs."

Research interests
Groves' research interests included human evolution, primates, mammalian taxonomy, skeletal analysis, biological anthropology, ethnobiology, cryptozoology, and biogeography. He conducted extensive fieldwork in Kenya, Tanzania, Rwanda, India, Iran, China, Indonesia, Sri Lanka and the Democratic Republic of Congo.

Selected publications

References

External links
 The Colin Groves Pages
 The Colin Groves Page (new page)
 The Groves Collection at No Answers in Genesis
 ANU Faculty Homepage
 ANU Researcher Profile page

1942 births
2017 deaths
Alumni of University College London
Australian anthropologists
Academic staff of the Australian National University
Australian sceptics
Critics of creationism
Primatologists